Louis Joseph "Ty" Rauber (September 8, 1905 – January 29, 1949) was a college football player, Navy Commander, and special agent with the FBI.

Early years
Rauber was born on September 8, 1905 in Wellsville, New York to John Rauber and Catherine Shaughnessy. He attended Central High School of Washington, D. C. and was captain of its 1923 football team.

Washington & Lee

Football
Rauber was a prominent fullback for the Washington & Lee Generals of Washington & Lee University. He was the first Generals player to make an All-East team, and the first All-American.

1925
Against Princeton in 1925, Ty once punted the ball from his end zone into a gale of wind which blew the ball right back into his arms. The Tigers then threw him for a safety.

1926

Rauber received All-Southern selections in 1926; receiving the third most votes of any player just behind Hoyt Winslett and Bill Spears.  He received a third-team All-American vote from the Associated Press.

Navy
Rauber was a Commander with the Navy, serving as legal officer in charge of the land division, called to active duty in 1939. He later went overseas with naval intelligence.

Later years
Rauber died in Guam of a heart attack after having fallen off a boat.

See also
1926 College Football All-America Team
1926 College Football All-Southern Team

References

External links 

 

Washington and Lee Generals football players
American football fullbacks
1905 births
1949 deaths
Players of American football from New York (state)
People from Wellsville, New York
Sportspeople from New York (state)
All-Southern college football players
Federal Bureau of Investigation agents